Giorgio Apollinari is an American physicist, currently at Fermi National Accelerator Laboratory and an Elected Fellow of the American Physical Society.

References

External links

Living people
Fellows of the American Physical Society
21st-century American physicists
20th-century Italian physicists
Year of birth missing (living people)
Place of birth missing (living people)